Northwest China is a statistical region of China which includes the autonomous regions of Xinjiang and Ningxia and the provinces of Shaanxi, Gansu and Qinghai. It has an area of 3,107,900 km2.

The region is characterized by a (semi-)arid continental climate. It has a diverse population including significant minorities such as Hui, Uyghurs and Tibetans. Culturally, the region has historically been influenced by the Silk Road.

Historic security considerations 
Chinese dynasties from the Qin (221 BC to 207 BC) to the Qing period (1644 CE to 1911 CE) placed high priority on maintaining stability and security in the region, motivated by concerns about potential threats from the Northwest.

Security concerns have continued under modern governments. During the Republic of China period, the government was only able to exercise loose control in the Northwest. In 1933, Pan-Islamic and Pan-Turkic separatists declared an Islamic Republic of East Turkestan based on constitutionally-enshrined Sharia law. The short-lived separatist Islamic Republic was not recognized by any other countries and was suppressed after three months of existence.

With Soviet Union backing, separatists declared a second short-lived East Turkestan Republic in 1944 based in Yining. The Soviet Union withdrew its support in June 1946. A separatist movement drawing on the legacy of the short-lived East Turkestan Republics continues today.

Northwest China during land reform movement 
During China's land reform movement (which began after the defeat of the Japanese in the Second Sino-Japanese War and continued in the early years of the People's Republic of China), the Communist Party encouraged rural women in achieving a "double fanshen" - a revolutionary transformation as both a peasant and a feminist awakening as a woman. The progress of Hui women in northwest China was promoted as by the Party as an example of such a success. Through the rural movement, Hui women were said to have not just received land, but also "freedom over their own bodies." Hui women embraced political participation and the rural revolution. The land reform movement succeeded among Hui people because activists first won over elder generations.

Administrative divisions

Cities with urban area over one million in population

Outer Northwest China 
Outer Northwest China refers to the portions of territories of the Qing dynasty that were later annexed by the Russian Empire through the Convention of Peking, Treaty of Tarbagatai, Treaty of Saint Petersburg (1881) and other unequal treaties referred by Chinese interpretation. During Qing rule, the territories formed parts of far-western Xinjiang and far-northwestern Outer Mongolia.

Tuva, at the time a part of the larger Tannu Uriankhai region in northwestern Outer Mongolia, is sometimes also included as it is now part of Russia and share a land border (thus geographically contiguous) with the territories that was ceded through the aforementioned unequal treaties. However, this inclusion is somewhat uncommon and does not conform to stricter definitions of Outer Northwest China as Tuva was not ceded to the Russian Empire during the Qing dynasty but was annexed during Soviet times after more than three decades of de facto independence from China following the Qing's collapse.

Prior to Qing rule, Outer Northwest China was part of the Dzungar Khanate but the region was annexed into the Qing Empire in the aftermath of the Dzungar–Qing Wars.

Following the dissolution of the Soviet Union, the region is now divided among four successor states of the Soviet Union: Kazakhstan, Kyrgyzstan, Tajikistan, and Russia.

See also
Ma clique
Tangut
List of regions of China
China Western Development

References 

Regions of China
Western China